Sam Figg (born 7 May 1992) is a South African born Australian professional rugby union player. He plays as a back row for the Glendale Raptors in Major League Rugby.

References

Australian rugby union players
1992 births
Living people
Rugby union flankers
Rugby union number eights
Rugby union players from Johannesburg